Menegatti is a surname of Italian origin. Notable people with the surname include: 

 Marta Menegatti (born 1990), Italian beach volleyball player
 Pietro Menegatti (born 1992), Italian footballer

References

 
Italian-language surnames